Bishopella is a genus of the harvestman family Phalangodidae, with two described species. B. jonesi occurs only in Alabama, while B. laciniosa is found in the southeastern United States.

The genus is named in honor of S. C. Bishop, who described the type species, together with C. R. Crosby.

Species
 Bishopella jonesi Goodnight & Goodnight, 1942
 Bishopella laciniosa (Crosby & Bishop, 1924)

References
 's Biology Catalog: Phalangodidae

Harvestmen
Arthropods of the United States